The Middle Tennessee Blue Raiders women's basketball team represents Middle Tennessee State University in women's basketball. The school competes in the Conference USA in Division I of the National Collegiate Athletic Association (NCAA). The Blue Raiders play home basketball games at Murphy Center in Murfreesboro, Tennessee.

History
As of the end of the 2020–21 season, the Blue Raiders have an all-time record of 943–436 in 46 seasons. They are coached by Rick Insell, in his 16th year at MT. They played in the Ohio Valley Conference from 1978 to 2000, the Sun Belt Conference from 2000 to 2013, and Conference USA since 2013.

NCAA tournament results

Notable players
 Alysha Clark (born 1987), American-Israeli basketball player for the Seattle Storm of the Women's National Basketball Association

References

External links